The Diplectanidae are a family of monopisthocotylean monogeneans. They are all parasitic on the gills of fish (marine or freshwater). Diplectanids are small animals, generally around 1 mm in length. As parasites, they can be extremely numerous, up to several thousand on an individual fish.

History
The family Diplectanidae was proposed by the Italian parasitologist Monticelli in 1903 (as subfamily Diplectaninae). The status of the family and its components was later examined by various authors, including Johnston & Tiegs (1922), Price (1937), Bychowsky (1957), Yamaguti (1963), and Oliver (1987).

Morphology

Diplectanids are diagnosed by the combination of these three characters:
 Presence of accessory adhesive organs on dorsal and ventral part of the haptor, called squamodiscs when they are made up of rodlets and lamellodiscs when they include lamellae 
 In the haptor, three transversal bars (one ventral, two lateral (dorsal), connected to two pairs of hooks (one pair dorsal, one pair ventral) 
 A germarium (or ovary) which is anterior to the testis and loops around the right intestinal caecum

Genera
The genera recognized in WoRMS  are:

 Acanthocercodes Kritsky & Diggles, 2015 
 Acleotrema Johnston & Tiegs, 1922 
 Aetheolabes Boeger & Kritsky, 2009 
 Anoplectanum Boeger, Fehlauer & Marques, 2006 
 Calydiscoides Young, 1969 
 Darwinoplectanum Domingues, Diamanka & Pariselle, 2011 
 Diplectanocotyla Yamaguti, 1953 
 Diplectanum Diesing, 1858 
 Echinoplectanum Justine & Euzet, 2006 
 Furcohaptor Bijukumar & Kearn, 1996 
 Lamellodiscus Johnston & Tiegs, 1922 
 Latericaecum Young, 1969 
 Laticola Yang, Kritsky, Sun, Zhang, Shi & Agrawal, 2006 
 Lepidotrema Johnston & Tiegs, 1922 
 Lobotrema Tripathi, 1959 
 Monoplectanum Young, 1969 
 Murraytrema Price, 1937 
 Murraytrematoides Yamaguti, 1958 
 Nasobranchitrema Yamaguti, 1965 
 Neodiplectanum Mizelle & Blatz, 1941 
 Oliveriplectanum Domingues & Boeger, 2008 
 Paradiplectanum Domingues & Boeger, 2008 
 Protolamellodiscus Oliver, 1969 
 Pseudodiplectanum Tripathi, 1955 
 Pseudolamellodiscus Yamaguti, 1953 
 Pseudomurraytrematoides Domingues & Boeger, 2008 
 Pseudorhabdosynochus Yamaguti, 1958 
 Pseudorhamnocercoides Chero, Cruces, Sáez, Iannacone & Luque, 2017 
 Rhabdosynochus Mizelle & Blatz, 1941 
 Rhamnocercoides Luque & Iannacone, 1991 
 Rhamnocercus Monaco, Wood & Mizelle, 1954 
 SinodiplectanotremaZhang in Zhang, Yang & Liu, 2001 
 Spinomatrix Boeger, Fehlauer & Marques, 2006 
 Telegamatrix Ramalingam, 1955 
 Teraplectanum Lim, 2015

References

 
Platyhelminthes families
Animal parasites of fish